First Presbyterian Church is a large church in downtown Colorado Springs, Colorado, established in 1872 by missionary Rev. Sheldon Jackson, who organized more than 100 churches in the central and western United States. First Pres was first led by Rev. Henry Gage who, while still a Princeton Theological Seminary student, became the first person of any denomination to preach in Colorado Springs. 

First Pres, as the church is commonly known, dedicated its first building on the corner of Weber Street and Kiowa Street on January 12, 1873. Subsequent sanctuary buildings were completed in 1889 and 1957, and additional educational facilities have been added in stages since that time. In 2017, a Contemporary Worship Center was finished, the first intentionally-designed contemporary worship venue in downtown Colorado Springs. 

The mission of First Pres is to be "Light and Life for the City" while we wait with eager expectation for the City of God. The purpose of First Pres is to worship God, believing that when we do so, lives are transformed. A commitment to Jesus Christ, to active participation in the downtown Colorado Springs community and to outreach to underserved populations have characterized First Pres since its inception. First Pres is a former member congregation of the Presbyterian Church USA. In 2012, the congregation voted to affiliate with ECO: A Covenant Order of Evangelical Presbyterians.

Jim DeJarnette, the faithful and accomplished Minister of Worship and Music at First Presbyterian Church, announced his retirement on November 18, 2020. This came into effect the summer of 2021. He served the Colorado Springs community for 40 years. During that time, he commandeered the 150+ voice adult choir, a children’s choir, handbell and brass ensembles that have drawn crowds from all over the city. 

First Presbyterian is home to the oldest continually-chartered Scout troop in the state of Colorado, Troop 2, originally chartered in October, 1917.

References 
“Jim DEJARNETTE'S ANNOUNCEMENT.” First Presbyterian Church Colorado Springs, Firs Pres , 18 Nov. 2020, www.firstprescos.org/jim-dejarnettes-announcement/. 

“ORGANIST – FULL-TIME. First Presbyterian Church, Colorado Springs, Colorado.” Eco-Pres, First Pres, Colorado Springs, eco-pres.org/static/media/uploads/first_pres_colorado_springs_organist.pdf.

External links 

Presbyterian churches in Colorado
1872 establishments in Colorado Territory
Presbyterian megachurches in the United States
Megachurches in Colorado
Religious organizations established in 1872
Buildings and structures in Colorado Springs, Colorado
Religion in Colorado Springs, Colorado